Gareth Bale is a Welsh former professional footballer who represented the Wales national football team as a forward from 2006 to 2022. He made his debut appearance for Wales on 27 May 2006, during a friendly against Trinidad and Tobago; at 16 years and 315 days old, Bale was the youngest ever player to represent the side at the time. In October 2006, during his third appearance for Wales, he scored directly from a free kick in a 5–1 UEFA Euro 2008 qualifying defeat against Slovakia to become the nation's youngest ever goalscorer. With 41 goals in 111 appearances, is the country's all-time top goalscorer.

On 13 October 2015, Bale scored his nineteenth international goal in a 2–0 victory over Andorra during Wales' final qualifying match for UEFA Euro 2016, helping secure the nation's first appearance at a major international tournament since the 1958 FIFA World Cup. Bale was Wales' top scorer in their successful qualifying campaign, finishing with a tally of seven goals. During the final tournament in France, Bale scored in all three group matches at the tournament, against Slovakia, Russia, and England, as Wales topped their group and would go on to reach the semi-finals. Bale's opener from a free kick in his side's first group game against Slovakia was the first goal at a major international tournament by a Welsh player since Terry Medwin scored against Hungary in 1958. Bale became the Welsh national team's all-time top goalscorer on 22 March 2018, after scoring a hat-trick in a friendly against China at the China Cup. Bale entered the match on 26 goals, two short of fellow countryman Ian Rush's record tally, having not scored an international goal in eighteen months since November 2016. He scored twice in the first half of the game to equal Rush's record, before surpassing it with his third goal in the second half. He also became the first Welsh player to score a hat-trick at international level since Robert Earnshaw in 2004. He scored his second hat-trick in a fixture in September 2021, during a 3–2 victory over Belarus.

Bale played for Wales in the qualifying campaigns of every FIFA World Cup and European Championship from UEFA Euro 2008 to the 2022 World Cup, as well as in the finals of Euro 2016, where the side reached the last four before being knocked out by eventual champions Portugal. He also featured in the finals of Euro 2020, where Wales reached the round of 16, but Bale failed to score a goal. At the 2022 World Cup, he scored Wales' only goal of the tournament against the United States. Bale scored more times in qualifying matches than in any other format with 28 goals (14 in Euro qualifiers and 14 in World Cup qualifiers). His other goals included six in friendly matches (including three in the China Cup), three in the European Championship finals, three in the UEFA Nations League and one in the World Cup finals. He scored more times against China, Belarus, Andorra and Austria than any other opponent, with three goals each against the sides.

Goals
Wales' score listed first, score column indicates score after each Bale goal.

Statistics

See also 

 List of international goals scored by Ian Rush
 List of top international men's association football goal scorers by country

Notes

References 

Bale, Gareth
Bale, Gareth